Christina Bellinghoven (born 6 August 1988) is a German football goalkeeper, who plays for Borussia Mönchengladbach.

Club career

FCR 2001 Duisburg
She spend almost her entire career playing for FCR 2001 Duisburg, either in the Bundesliga (top division) or 2. Bundesliga (second division). On 10 May 2012, Bellinghoven confirmed her retirement from professional football. However, she made a comeback during the following season.

In 2016, she was back in the Bundesliga playing for Borussia Mönchengladbach.

Honours

FCR 2001 Duisburg
Bundesliga: Runner-up (2) 2007–08, 2009–10
German Cup: Winner (2) 2008–09, 2009–10
UEFA Women's Cup: Winner (1) 2008–09

References

External links
 

1988 births
Living people
Footballers from Düsseldorf
German women's footballers
Women's association football goalkeepers
1. FFC Turbine Potsdam players
FCR 2001 Duisburg players
Borussia Mönchengladbach (women) players